Piece is the first Japanese-language album and second studio album of the South Korean boy group Monsta X. It was released and distributed by Universal Music Japan on April 25, 2018.

Background and release
The album was announced in February 2018, as Monsta X's first Japanese album. The album consists of ten tracks, including four new tracks, while the other six were already released singles or Japanese versions of some of the group's earlier Korean tracks. Just prior to the release of this album, in March 2018, "Spotlight", originally released in January that year, became a certified gold single by RIAJ, the first of the group's Japanese singles to achieve this certification.

On April 10, a music video for the track "Puzzle" was released in advance of the album, with a short version of the music video posted to YouTube.

The album was released in three versions, the regular version and limited editions A and B.

Following the release of the album, Monsta X held their first Japanese tour, through April and May 2018.

Commercial performance 
The album sold more than 55,000 copies in Japan. The album had three tracks which charted in Japan, although the track "Puzzle" did not; these are the Japanese versions of "Hero" and "Beautiful", as well as "Spotlight".

Track listing

Charts

Album

Weekly charts

Songs

Weekly charts

Certification and sales

References 

2018 albums
Japanese-language albums
Universal Music Japan albums
Monsta X albums